is a former Japanese marathon runner. After finishing second in the Fukuoka Marathon 1998 with his career best of 2:08:48, he won the bronze medal at the 1999 World Championships in Athletics.

At the Olympics 2000, he finished in 41st place.

Achievements

External links 
 

Japanese male long-distance runners
Japanese male marathon runners
Olympic athletes of Japan
Athletes (track and field) at the 2000 Summer Olympics
1972 births
Living people
People from Kariya, Aichi
World Athletics Championships medalists
Sportspeople from Aichi Prefecture